Águas Santas is a Portuguese town and parish located in the municipality of Maia. The population in 2011 was 27,470, in an area of 8.23 km2, making it one of the most densely populated towns in the Porto District. It is located about 3.5 kilometers north of the city of Porto, near river Leça.

History 
The first references to Águas Santas are found in a document dating from the year 1120, where Pope Callixtus II mentions the monastery of Aquis Sanctis.

See also 
Associação Atlética de Águas Santas - the local professional handball team
Cerealis - a Portuguese food producer headquartered in Águas Santas

References 

Towns in Portugal
Freguesias of Maia, Portugal